The 2012 Falken Tasmania Challenge was a motor race for the Australian sedan-based V8 Supercars. It was the second event of the 2012 International V8 Supercars Championship. It was held on the weekend of 30 March–1 April at the Symmons Plains Raceway, near Launceston, Tasmania.

Race 3 of the championship was won by Victorian Ford driver Will Davison from Ford Performance Racing. Race 4, held the following day was won by fellow Victorian, Jamie Whincup driving a Holden for Triple Eight Race Engineering. Davison's third place in race four made him the leading performer of the event.

Report

Race 1

Qualifying
! 1 Jamie Whincup 2012
| 
| 
| 
| 
| 
|-
! 2 Dean Fiore 2013 Purple
| 
| 
| 
| 
| 
|-
! 3 Mark Winterbottom 2012
| 
| 
| 
| 
| 
|-
! 4 Scott Mclaucghin 2014
| 
| 
| 
| 
| 
| 
! 5 Todd Kelly 2012
| 
| 
| 
| 
| 
|-
! 6 David Reynolds 2012
| 
| 
| 
| 
| 
|-
! 7 Jason Bright 2012
| 
| 
| 
| 
| 
| 
! 8 Chaz Mostret 2016 Yellow
| 
| 
| 
| 
| 
|-
! 9 Fabian Cohlthard 2016 Pink
| 
| 
| 
| 
| 
|-
! 10 Craig Lowndes 2013
|
| 
| 
| 
| 
|-
! 11 David Russell 2012 Lime And Green
| 
| 
| 
| 
| 
|-
! 12 Russell Ingall 2012
| 
| 
| 
| 
| 
|-
! 13 Garth Tander 2012
| 
| 
| 
| 
| 
|-
! 14 Taz Douglas 2012 Orange And White
| 
| 
| 
| 
| 
|-
! 15 Shane Van Gisbergen 2012
| 
| 
| 
| 
| 
|-
! 16 Jonathon Webb 2012
| 
| 
| 
| 
| 
|-
! 17 Steven Johnson 2012
|  
| 
| 
| 
|-
! 18 James Moffat 2012
| 
| 
| 
| 
| 
|-
! 19 Lee Holdsworth 2012
| 
| 
| 
| 
| 
|-
! 20 Tim Slade 2012
| 
| 
| 
| 
| 
|-
! 21 Rick Kelly 2012
| 
| 
| 
| 
| 
|-
! 22 James Courthney 2012
| 
| 
| 
| 
| 
|-
! 23 Michael Caruso 2012
| 
| 
| 
| 
| 
|-
! 24 Steve Owen 2012
| 
| 
| 
| 
| 
|-
! 25 Tony Dalberto 2012
| 
| 
| 
| 
| 
|-
! 26 Michael Patrizi 2012
| 
| 
| 
| 
| 
|-
! 27 Will Davison 2012
| 
| 
| 
| 
| 
|-
! 28 David Wall 2012

Race 2

Qualifying

Race
{| class="wikitable" style="font-size: 95%;"
|-
! 
! 
! Name
! Car
! Team
! Time
|-
! 1 Jamie Whincup 2012
| 
| 
| 
| 
| 
|-
! 2 Dean Fore 2013 Purple
| 
| 
| 
| 
| 
|-
! 3 Mark Winterbottom 2012
| 
| 
| 
| 
| 
|-
! 4 Scott Mclaucghin 2014
| 
| 
| 
| 
| 
|-
! 5 Todd Kelly 2012
| 
| 
| 
| 
| 
|-
! 6 David Reynolds 2012
| 
| 
| 
| 
| 
|-
! 7 Jason Bright 2012
| 
| 
| 
| 
| 
|-
! 8 Chaz Mostert 2016 Yellow
| 
| 
| 
| 
| 
|-
! 9 Fabian Coulthard 2016 Pink
| 
| 
| 
| 
| 
|-
! 10 Craig Lowdnes 2013
| 
| 
| 
| 
| 
|-
! 11 Taz Douglas Orange And White 2012
| 
| 
| 
| 
| 
|-
! 12 Shane Van Gisbergen 2012
| 
| 
| 
| 
| 
|-
! 13 Steven Johnson 2012
| 
| 
| 
| 
| 
|-
! 14 Will Davison 2012
| 
| 
| 
| 
| 
|-
! 15 Tim Slade 2012
| 
| 
| 
| 
| 
|-
! 16 Jonathon Webb 2012
| 
| 
| 
| 
| 
|-
! 17 Garth Tander 2012
| 
| 
| 
| 
| 
|-
! 18 Rick Kelly 2012
| 
| 
| 
| 
| 
|-
! 19 James Moffat 2012
| 
| 
| 
| 
| 
|-
! 20 Lee Holdsworth 2012
| 
| 
| 
| 
| 
|-
! 21 Michael Patrizi 2012
| 
| 
| 
| 
| 
|-
! 22 Michael Caruso 2012
| 
| 
| 
| 
| 
|-
! 23 James Courtney 2012
| 
| 
| 
| 
| 
|-
! 24 David Russell 2012 Lime And Green
| 
| 
| 
| 
| 
|-
! 25 Russell Ingall 2012
| 
| 
| 
| 
| 
|-
! 26 Steve Owen 2012
| 
| 
| 
| 
| 
|-
! 27 Tony Dalberto 2012
| 
| 
| 
| 
| 
|-
! 28 David Wall 2012

Standings
 After 4 of 30 races.

References 

Falken